Johann Christiani von Schleppegrell, O.S.A. (1389–8 Oct 1468) was a Roman Catholic prelate who served as Auxiliary Bishop of Hildesheim (1428–1468), Auxiliary Bishop of Minden (1428–1468), and Auxiliary Bishop of Münster (1428–1468).

Biography
Christiani von Schleppegrell was born in 1389 and ordained a priest in the Order of Saint Augustine. On 7 Jun 1428, he was appointed during the papacy of Pope Martin V as Auxiliary Bishop of Hildesheim, Auxiliary Bishop of Münster, Auxiliary Bishop of Minden, and Titular Bishop of Missene. He served as Auxiliary Bishop of Hildesheim until his death on 8 Oct 1468.

References 

15th-century German Roman Catholic bishops
Bishops appointed by Pope Martin V
1389 births
1468 deaths
Augustinian bishops